Climate change denial, or global warming denial, is denial, dismissal, or unwarranted doubt that contradicts the scientific consensus on climate change, including the extent to which it is caused by humans, its effects on nature and human society, or the potential of adaptation to global warming by human actions. Many who deny, dismiss, or hold unwarranted doubt about the scientific consensus on anthropogenic global warming self-label as "climate change skeptics", which several scientists have noted is an inaccurate description. Climate change denial can also be implicit when individuals or social groups accept the science but fail to come to terms with it or to translate their acceptance into action. Several social science studies have analyzed these positions as forms of denial or denialism, pseudoscience, or propaganda.

The campaign to undermine public trust in climate science has been described as a "denial machine" organized by industrial, political and ideological interests, and supported by conservative media and skeptical bloggers to manufacture uncertainty about global warming.

The politics of global warming have been affected by climate change denial and the political global warming controversy, undermining the efforts to act on climate change or adapting to the warming climate. Those promoting denial commonly use rhetorical tactics to give the appearance of a scientific controversy where there is none.

Organized campaigning to undermine public trust in climate science is associated with conservative economic policies and backed by industrial interests opposed to the regulation of  emissions. Climate change denial has been associated with the fossil fuels lobby, the Koch brothers, industry advocates and conservative think tanks, often in the United States. More than 90% of papers skeptical on climate change originate from right-wing think tanks.

As recently as the 1970s, oil companies were publishing research which broadly concurred with the scientific community's view on global warming. Despite this, oil companies organized a climate change denial campaign to disseminate public disinformation for several decades, a strategy that has been compared to the organized denial of the hazards of tobacco smoking by the tobacco industry, and often even carried out by the same individuals who previously spread the tobacco industry's denialist propaganda.

Terminology 
"Climate change skepticism" and "climate change denial" refer to denial, dismissal or unwarranted doubt of the scientific consensus on the rate and extent of global warming, its significance, or its connection to human behavior, in whole or in part. Though there is a distinction between skepticism which indicates doubting the truth of an assertion and outright denial of the truth of an assertion, in the public debate phrases such as "climate skepticism" have frequently been used with the same meaning as climate denialism or contrarianism.

The terminology emerged in the 1990s. Even though all scientists adhere to scientific skepticism as an inherent part of the process, by mid November 1995 the word "skeptic" was being used specifically for the minority who publicized views contrary to the scientific consensus. This small group of scientists presented their views in public statements and the media, rather than to the scientific community. This usage continued. In his December 1995 article "The Heat is On: The warming of the world's climate sparks a blaze of denial", Ross Gelbspan said industry had engaged "a small band of skeptics" to confuse public opinion in a "persistent and well-funded campaign of denial". His 1997 book The Heat is On may have been the first to concentrate specifically on the topic. In it, Gelbspan discussed a "pervasive denial of global warming" in a "persistent campaign of denial and suppression" involving "undisclosed funding of these 'greenhouse skeptics' " with "the climate skeptics" confusing the public and influencing decision makers.

A November 2006 CBC Television documentary on the campaign was titled The Denial Machine. In 2007 journalist Sharon Begley reported on the "denial machine", a phrase subsequently used by academics.

In addition to explicit denial, social groups have shown implicit denial by accepting the scientific consensus, but failing to "translate their acceptance into action". This was exemplified in Kari Norgaard's study of a village in Norway affected by climate change, where residents diverted their attention to other issues.

The terminology is debated: most of those actively rejecting the scientific consensus use the terms skeptic and climate change skepticism, and only a few have expressed preference for being described as deniers, but the word "skepticism" is incorrectly used, as scientific skepticism is an intrinsic part of scientific methodology. The term contrarian is more specific, but used less frequently. In academic literature and journalism, the terms "climate change denial" and "climate change deniers" have well-established usage as descriptive terms without any pejorative intent. Both the National Center for Science Education and historian Spencer R. Weart recognize that either option is problematic, but have decided to use "climate change denial" rather than "skepticism".

Terms related to "denialism" have been criticized for introducing a moralistic tone, and potentially implying a link with Holocaust denial. There have been claims that this link is intentional, which academics have strongly disputed. The usage of "denial" long predates the Holocaust, and is commonly applied in other areas such as HIV/AIDS denialism: the claim is described by John Timmer of Ars Technica as itself being a form of denial.

In December 2014, an open letter from the Committee for Skeptical Inquiry called on the media to stop using the term "skepticism" when referring to climate change denial. They contrasted scientific skepticism—which is "foundational to the scientific method"—with denial—"the a priori rejection of ideas without objective consideration"—and the behavior of those involved in political attempts to undermine climate science. They said "Not all individuals who call themselves climate change skeptics are deniers. But virtually all deniers have falsely branded themselves as skeptics. By perpetrating this misnomer, journalists have granted undeserved credibility to those who reject science and scientific inquiry." In June 2015 Media Matters for America were told by The New York Times public editor that the newspaper was increasingly tending to use "denier" when "someone is challenging established science", but assessing this on an individual basis with no fixed policy, and would not use the term when someone was "kind of wishy-washy on the subject or in the middle." The executive director of the Society of Environmental Journalists said that while there was reasonable skepticism about specific issues, she felt that denier was "the most accurate term when someone claims there is no such thing as global warming, or agrees that it exists but denies that it has any cause we could understand or any impact that could be measured."

The Committee for Skeptical Inquiry letter inspired a petition by climatetruth.org in which signers were asked to "Tell the Associated Press: Establish a rule in the AP StyleBook ruling out the use of 'skeptic' to describe those who deny scientific facts." On 22 September 2015, the Associated Press announced "an addition to AP Stylebook entry on global warming" which advised, "to describe those who don't accept climate science or dispute the world is warming from human-made forces, use climate change doubters or those who reject mainstream climate science. Avoid use of skeptics or deniers." On 17 May 2019, The Guardian also rejected use of the term "climate skeptic" in favor of "climate science denier".

History 

In 1860, John Tyndall quantified the effects of greenhouse gases on absorption of infrared radiation. Svante Arrhenius in 1896 showed that coal burning could cause global warming, and in 1938 Guy Stewart Callendar found it already happening to some extent. Research advanced rapidly after 1940; from 1957, Roger Revelle alerted the public to risks that fossil fuel burning was "a grandiose scientific experiment" on climate. NASA and NOAA took on research, the 1979 Charney Report concluded that substantial warming was already on the way, and "A wait-and-see policy may mean waiting until it is too late."

In 1959, a scientist working for Shell suggested in a New Scientist article, that carbon cycles are too vast to upset Nature's balance. By 1966 however, a coal industry research organization, Bituminous Coal Research Inc., published its finding that if then prevailing trends of coal consumption continue, "the temperature of the earth's atmosphere will increase and that vast changes in the climates of the earth will result." "Such changes in temperature will cause melting of the polar icecaps, which, in turn, would result in the inundation of many coastal cities, including New York and London." In a discussion following this paper in the same publication, a combustion engineer for Peabody Coal, now Peabody Energy, the world's largest coal supplier, added that the coal industry was merely "buying time" before additional government air pollution regulations would be promulgated to clean the air. Nevertheless, the coal industry for decades thereafter publicly advocated the position that increased carbon dioxide in the atmosphere is beneficial for the planet.

In response to increasing public awareness of the greenhouse effect in the 1970s, conservative reaction built up, denying environmental concerns which could lead to government regulation. In 1977 the first Secretary of Energy, Republican James Schlesinger, suggested President Jimmy Carter inaction regarding a climate change memo citing uncertainty. With the 1981 Presidency of Ronald Reagan, global warming became a political issue, with immediate plans to cut spending on environmental research, particularly climate-related, and stop funding for  monitoring. Reagan appointed as Secretary of Energy James B. Edwards, who said that there was no real global warming problem. Congressman Al Gore had studied under Revelle and was aware of the developing science: he joined others in arranging congressional hearings from 1981 onwards, with testimony by scientists including Revelle, Stephen Schneider and Wallace Smith Broecker. The hearings gained enough public attention to reduce the cuts in atmospheric research. A polarized party-political debate developed. In 1982, Sherwood B. Idso published his book Carbon Dioxide: Friend or Foe? which said increases in  would not warm the planet, but would fertilize crops and were "something to be encouraged and not suppressed", while complaining that his theories had been rejected by the "scientific establishment". An Environmental Protection Agency (EPA) report in 1983 said global warming was "not a theoretical problem but a threat whose effects will be felt within a few years", with potentially "catastrophic" consequences. The Reagan administration reacted by calling the report "alarmist", and the dispute got wide news coverage. Public attention turned to other issues, then the 1985 finding of a polar ozone hole brought a swift international response. To the public, this was related to climate change and the possibility of effective action, but news interest faded.

Public attention was renewed amidst summer droughts and heat waves when James Hansen testified to a Congressional hearing on 23 June 1988, stating with high confidence that long-term warming was underway with severe warming likely within the next 50 years, and warning of likely storms and floods. There was increasing media attention: the scientific community had reached a broad consensus that the climate was warming, human activity was very likely the primary cause, and there would be significant consequences if the warming trend was not curbed. These facts encouraged discussion about new laws concerning environmental regulation, which was opposed by the fossil fuel industry.

From 1989 onwards industry-funded organizations including the Global Climate Coalition and the George C. Marshall Institute sought to spread doubt among the public, in a strategy already developed by the tobacco industry. A small group of scientists opposed to the consensus on global warming became politically involved, and with support from conservative political interests, began publishing in books and the press rather than in scientific journals. This small group of scientists included some of the same people that were part of the strategy already tried by the tobacco industry. Spencer Weart identifies this period as the point where legitimate skepticism about basic aspects of climate science was no longer justified, and those spreading mistrust about these issues became deniers. As their arguments were increasingly refuted by the scientific community and new data, deniers turned to political arguments, making personal attacks on the reputation of scientists, and promoting ideas of a global warming conspiracy.

With the 1989 fall of communism and the environmental movement's international reach at the 1992 Rio Earth Summit, the attention of U.S. conservative think tanks, which had been organized in the 1970s as an intellectual counter-movement to socialism, turned from the "red scare" to the "green scare" which they saw as a threat to their aims of private property, free trade market economies and global capitalism. As a counter-movement, they used environmental skepticism to promote denial of the reality of problems such as loss of biodiversity and climate change.

In 1992, an EPA report linked second-hand smoke with lung cancer. The tobacco industry engaged the APCO Worldwide public relations company, which set out a strategy of astroturfing campaigns to cast doubt on the science by linking smoking anxieties with other issues, including global warming, in order to turn public opinion against calls for government intervention. The campaign depicted public concerns as "unfounded fears" supposedly based only on "junk science" in contrast to their "sound science", and operated through front groups, primarily the Advancement of Sound Science Center (TASSC) and its Junk Science website, run by Steven Milloy. A tobacco company memo commented "Doubt is our product since it is the best means of competing with the 'body of fact' that exists in the mind of the general public. It is also the means of establishing a controversy." During the 1990s, the tobacco campaign died away, and TASSC began taking funding from oil companies including Exxon. Its website became central in distributing "almost every kind of climate-change denial that has found its way into the popular press."

In the 1990s, the Marshall Institute began campaigning against increased regulations on environmental issues such as acid rain, ozone depletion, second-hand smoke, and the dangers of DDT. In each case their argument was that the science was too uncertain to justify any government intervention, a strategy it borrowed from earlier efforts to downplay the health effects of tobacco in the 1980s. This campaign would continue for the next two decades.

These efforts succeeded in influencing public perception of climate science. Between 1988 and the 1990s, public discourse shifted from the science and data of climate change to discussion of politics and surrounding controversy.

The campaign to spread doubt continued into the 1990s, including an advertising campaign funded by coal industry advocates intended to "reposition global warming as theory rather than fact", and a 1998 proposal written by the American Petroleum Institute intending to recruit scientists to convince politicians, the media and the public that climate science was too uncertain to warrant environmental regulation. The proposal included a US$ 5,000,000 multi-point strategy to "maximize the impact of scientific views consistent with ours on Congress, the media and other key audiences", with a goal of "raising questions about and undercutting the 'prevailing scientific wisdom'".

In 1998, Gelbspan noted that his fellow journalists accepted that global warming was occurring, but said they were in "'stage-two' denial of the climate crisis", unable to accept the feasibility of answers to the problem. A subsequent book by Milburn and Conrad on The Politics of Denial described "economic and psychological forces" producing denial of the consensus on global warming issues.

These efforts by climate change denial groups were recognized as an organized campaign beginning in the 2000s. The sociologists Riley Dunlap and Aaron McCright played a significant role in this shift when they published an article in 2000 exploring the connection between conservative think tanks and climate change denial. Later work would continue the argument specific groups were marshaling skepticism against climate changea study in 2008 from the University of Central Florida analyzed the sources of "environmentally skeptical" literature published in the United States. The analysis demonstrated that 92% of the literature was partly or wholly affiliated with a self-proclaimed conservative think tanks. A later piece of research from 2015 identified 4,556 individuals with overlapping network ties to 164 organizations which are responsible for the most efforts to downplay the threat of climate change in the U.S.

Gelbspan's Boiling Point, published in 2004, detailed the fossil-fuel industry's campaign to deny climate change and undermine public confidence in climate science. In Newsweek August 2007 cover story "The Truth About Denial", Sharon Begley reported that "the denial machine is running at full throttle", and said that this "well-coordinated, well-funded campaign" by contrarian scientists, free-market think tanks, and industry had "created a paralyzing fog of doubt around climate change."

Referencing work of sociologists Robert Antonio and Robert Brulle, Wayne A. White has written that climate change denial has become the top priority in a broader anti-environmental regulation agenda being pursued by neoliberals. Today, climate change skepticism is most prominently seen in the United States, where the media disproportionately features views of the climate change denial community. In addition to the media, the contrarian movement has also been sustained by the growth of the internet, having gained some of its support from internet bloggers, talk radio hosts and newspaper columnists.

The New York Times and others reported in 2015 that oil companies knew that burning oil and gas could cause climate change and global warming since the 1970s but nonetheless funded deniers for years. Dana Nuccitelli wrote in The Guardian that a small fringe group of climate deniers were no longer taken seriously at the 2015 United Nations Climate Change Conference, in an agreement that "we need to stop delaying and start getting serious about preventing a climate crisis." However, The New York Times says any implementation is voluntary and will depend on any future world leaders—and every Republican U.S. presidential candidate in 2016 questioned or denied the science of climate change.

Ernesto Araújo, the new Minister of Foreign Affairs appointed by the newly elected president Brazil's president Jair Bolsonaro has called global warming a plot by "cultural Marxists" and has eliminated the Climate Change Division of the ministry.

Denial networks

United States 
The climate change denial industry is most powerful in the United States. In the 2016 United States election cycle, every Republican presidential candidate questioned or denied climate change, and opposed U.S. government steps to address climate change as has the Republican leader in the U.S. Senate.

A Pentagon report has pointed out how climate change denial threatens national security. A study from 2015 identified 4,556 individuals with overlapping network ties to 164 organizations which are responsible for the most efforts to downplay the threat of climate change in the U.S.

In 2013, the Center for Media and Democracy reported that the State Policy Network (SPN), an umbrella group of 64 U.S. think tanks, had been lobbying on behalf of major corporations and conservative donors to oppose climate change regulation.

According to an investigative report in the Chronicle of Higher Education, influential academic papers used to support climate change denialism were written by authors affiliated with Harvard, MIT, and Georgetown University who had undisclosed conflict of interest.

International
The Clexit Coalition claims to be: "A new international organisation (which) aims to prevent ratification of the costly and dangerous Paris global warming treaty". It has members in 26 countries. According to The Guardian newspaper: "Clexit leaders are heavily involved in tobacco and fossil fuel-funded organizations".

Publishers, websites 

In November 2021, a study by the Center for Countering Digital Hate identified "ten fringe publishers" that together were responsible for nearly 70 percent of Facebook user interactions with content that denied climate change. Facebook said the percentage was overstated and called the study misleading.

The "toxic ten" publishers: Breitbart News, The Western Journal, Newsmax, Townhall, Media Research Center, The Washington Times, The Federalist, The Daily Wire, RT (TV network), and The Patriot Post.

The Rebel Media and its director, Ezra Levant, have promoted climate change denial and oil sands extraction in Alberta.

Arguments and positions on global warming 

Some climate change denial groups say that because  is only a trace gas in the atmosphere (roughly 400ppm, or 0.04%, 4 parts per 10,000) it can only have a minor effect on the climate. Scientists have known for over a century that even this small proportion has a significant warming effect, and doubling the proportion leads to a large temperature increase. The scientific consensus, as summarized by the IPCC fourth assessment report, the U.S. Geological Survey, and other reports, is that human activity is the leading cause of climate change. The burning of fossil fuels accounts for around 30 billion tons of  each year, which is 130 times the amount produced by volcanoes. Some groups allege that water vapor is a more significant greenhouse gas, and is left out of many climate models. Water vapor has been incorporated into climate models since their inception in the late 1800s.

Climate denial groups may also argue that global warming stopped recently, a global warming hiatus, or that global temperatures are actually decreasing, leading to global cooling. These arguments are based on short term fluctuations, and ignore the long term pattern of warming.

These groups often point to natural variability, such as sunspots and cosmic rays, to explain the warming trend. According to these groups, there is natural variability that will abate over time, and human influences have little to do with it. These factors are already taken into account when developing climate models, and the scientific consensus is that they cannot explain the observed warming trend.

At a May 2018 meeting of the United States House Committee on Science, Space, and Technology, Alabama's Representative Mo Brooks claimed that sea level rise is caused not by melting glaciers but rather by coastal erosion and silt that flows from rivers into the ocean.

Climate change denial literature often features the suggestion that we should wait for better technologies before addressing climate change, when they will be more affordable and effective.

Conspiracy theories 

Global warming conspiracy theories have been posited which allege that the scientific consensus is illusory, or that climatologists are acting on their own financial interests by causing undue alarm about a changing climate. Despite leaked emails during the Climatic Research Unit email controversy, as well as multinational, independent research on the topic, no evidence of such a conspiracy has been presented, and strong consensus exists among scientists from a multitude of political, social, organizational and national backgrounds about the extent and cause of climate change. Several researchers have concluded that around 97% of climate scientists agree with this consensus. As well, much of the data used in climate science is publicly available to be viewed and interpreted by competing researchers as well as the public.

In 2012, research by Stephan Lewandowsky (then of the University of Western Australia) concluded that belief in other conspiracy theories, such as that the FBI was responsible for the assassination of Martin Luther King, Jr., was associated with being more likely to endorse climate change denial.

In February 2015, climate change denier Jim Inhofe, who had previously called climate change "the greatest hoax ever perpetrated against the American people", claimed to have debunked the alleged hoax when he brought a snowball with him in the U.S. Senate chamber and tossed it across the floor. He was succeeded in 2017 by John Barrasso, who similarly said: "The climate is constantly changing. The role human activity plays is not known."

Donald Trump tweeted in 2012 that the Chinese invented "the concept of global warming" because they believed it would somehow hurt U.S. manufacturing. In late 2015, he called global warming a "hoax."

Taxonomy of climate change denial 

In 2004, Stefan Rahmstorf described how the media give the misleading impression that climate change was still disputed within the scientific community, attributing this impression to PR efforts of climate change skeptics. He identified different positions argued by climate skeptics, which he used as a taxonomy of climate change skepticism: Later the model was also applied on denial.

This taxonomy has been used in social science for analysis of publications, and to categorize climate change skepticism and climate change denial. Sometimes, a fourth category called "consensus denial" is added, which describes people who question the existence of the scientific consensus on anthropogenic global warming.

The National Center for Science Education describes climate change denial as disputing differing points in the scientific consensus, a sequential range of arguments from denying the occurrence of climate change, accepting that but denying any significant human contribution, accepting these but denying scientific findings on how this would affect nature and human society, to accepting all these but denying that humans can mitigate or reduce the problems. James L. Powell provides a more extended list, as does climatologist Michael E. Mann in "six stages of denial", a ladder model whereby deniers have over time conceded acceptance of points, while retreating to a position which still rejects the mainstream consensus:

Journalists and newspaper columnists including George Monbiot and Ellen Goodman, among others, have described climate change denial as a form of denialism.

Denialism in this context has been defined by Chris and Mark Hoofnagle as the use of rhetorical devices "to give the appearance of legitimate debate where there is none, an approach that has the ultimate goal of rejecting a proposition on which a scientific consensus exists." This process characteristically uses one or more of the following tactics:
 Allegations that scientific consensus involves conspiring to fake data or suppress the truth: a global warming conspiracy theory.
 Fake experts, or individuals with views at odds with established knowledge, at the same time marginalising or denigrating published topic experts. Like the manufactured doubt over smoking and health, a few contrarian scientists oppose the climate consensus, some of them the same individuals.
 Selectivity, such as cherry picking atypical or even obsolete papers, in the same way that the MMR vaccine controversy was based on one paper: examples include discredited ideas of the medieval warm period.
 Unworkable demands of research, claiming that any uncertainty invalidates the field or exaggerating uncertainty while rejecting probabilities and mathematical models.
 Logical fallacies.

In 2015, environmentalist Bill McKibben accused President Obama (widely regarded as strongly in favour of action on climate change) of "Catastrophic Climate-Change Denial", for his approval of oil-drilling permits in offshore Alaska. According to McKibben, the President has also "opened huge swaths of the Powder River basin to new coal mining." McKibben calls this "climate denial of the status quo sort", where the President denies "the meaning of the science, which is that we must keep carbon in the ground."

A study assessed the public perception and actions to climate change, on grounds of belief systems, and identified seven psychological barriers affecting the behavior that otherwise would facilitate mitigation, adaptation, and environmental stewardship. The author found the following barriers: cognition, ideological world views, comparisons to key people, costs and momentum, discredence toward experts and authorities, perceived risks of change, and inadequate behavioral changes.

Pseudoscience 

Various groups, including the National Center for Science Education, have described climate change denial as a form of pseudoscience. Climate change skepticism, while in some cases professing to do research on climate change, has focused instead on influencing the opinion of the public, legislators and the media, in contrast to legitimate science.

In a review of the book The Pseudoscience Wars: Immanuel Velikovsky and the Birth of the Modern Fringe by Michael D. Gordin, David Morrison wrote:

False beliefs 

Explaining the techniques of science denial and misinformation, by presenting "examples of people using cherrypicking or fake experts or false balance to mislead the public", has been shown to inoculate people somewhat against misinformation.

Dialogue focused on the question of how belief differs from scientific theory may provide useful insights into how the scientific method works, and how beliefs may have strong or minimal supporting evidence. Wong-Parodi's survey of the literature shows four effective approaches to dialogue, including "[encouraging] people to openly share their values and stance on climate change before introducing actual scientific climate information into the discussion."

Emotional and psychological aspects 

The director of the Yale Program on Climate Change Communication said that one "almost couldn't design a worse fit for our underlying psychology or our institutions of decision-making" than dealing with climate change—owing primarily to the short-term focus of humans and their institutions. Florida Republican Tom Lee described the emotional impact and reactions of individuals to climate change, saying "If these predictions do bear out, that it's just economically daunting. ... That's why I use the term emotionally shut down, because I think you lose people at hello a lot of times in the Republican conversation over this."

Personal reactions to climate change may include anxiety, depression, despair, dissonance, uncertainty, insecurity, and distress, with one psychologist suggesting that "despair about our changing climate may get in the way of fixing it." The American Psychological Association has urged psychologists and other social scientists to work on psychological barriers to taking action on climate change. The immediacy of a growing number of extreme weather events, and tax incentives for energy efficiency and for purchasing electric vehicles, are thought to motivate people to deal with climate change.

Responding to climate denial – the role of emotions and persuasive argument 
An Irish Times article notes that climate denial "is not simply overcome by reasoned argument", because it is not a rational response. Attempting to overcome denial using techniques of persuasive argument, such as supplying a missing piece of information, or providing general scientific education may be ineffective. A person who is in denial about climate is most likely taking a position based on their feelings, especially their feelings about things they fear.

Lewandowsky has stated that "It is pretty clear that fear of the solutions drives much opposition to the science."

It can be useful to respond to emotions, including with the statement "It can be painful to realise that our own lifestyles are responsible", in order to help move "from denial to acceptance to constructive action."

Farmers and climate denial 
Seeing positive economic results from efforts at climate-friendly agricultural practices, or becoming involved in intergenerational stewardship of a farm may play a role in turning farmers away from denial. One study of climate change denial among farmers in Australia found that farmers were less likely to take a position of climate denial if they had experienced improved production from climate-friendly practices, or identified a younger person as a successor for their farm.

In the United States, rural climate dialogues sponsored by the Sierra Club have helped neighbors overcome their fears of political polarization and exclusion, and come together to address shared concerns about climate impacts in their communities. Some participants who start out with attitudes of anthropogenic climate change denial have shifted to identifying concerns which they would like to see addressed by local officials.

People who have changed their position 
"I used to be a climate-change skeptic", conservative columnist Max Boot admitted in 2018, one who believed that "the science was inconclusive" and that worry was "overblown". Now, he says, referencing the Fourth National Climate Assessment, "the scientific consensus is so clear and convincing."
Climate change doubter Bob Inglis, a former US representative for South Carolina, changed his mind after appeals from his son on his environmental positions, and after spending time with climate scientist Scott Heron studying coral bleaching in the Great Barrier Reef. Inglis lost his House race in 2010, and went on to found republicEn, a nonprofit promoting conservative voices and solutions on climate change.

Jerry Taylor promoted climate denialism for 20 years as former staff director for the energy and environment task force at the American Legislative Exchange Council (ALEC) and former vice president of the Cato Institute. Taylor began to change his mind after climate scientist James Hansen challenged him to reread some Senate testimony. He became President of the Niskanen Center in 2014, where he is involved in turning climate skeptics into climate activists, and making the business case for climate action.

In 2009, Russian president Dmitri Medvedev expressed his opinion that climate change was "some kind of tricky campaign made up by some commercial structures to promote their business projects". After the devastating 2010 Russian wildfires damaged agriculture and left Moscow choking in smoke, Medvedev commented, "Unfortunately, what is happening now in our central regions is evidence of this global climate change."

Michael Shermer, the publisher of Skeptic magazine, reached a tipping point in 2006 as a result of his increasing familiarity with scientific evidence, and decided there was "overwhelming evidence for anthropogenic global warming". Journalist Gregg Easterbrook, an early skeptic of climate change who authored the influential book A Moment on the Earth, also changed his mind in 2006, and wrote an essay titled "Case Closed: The Debate About Global Warming is Over".

Weather Channel senior meteorologist Stu Ostro expressed skepticism or cynicism about anthropogenic global warming for some years, but by 2010, he had become involved in explaining the connections between man-made climate change and extreme weather.

Richard A. Muller, professor of physics at the University of California, Berkeley, and the co-founder of the Berkeley Earth Surface Temperature project, funded by Charles Koch Charitable Foundation, has been a prominent critic of prevailing climate science. In 2011, he stated that "following an intensive research effort involving a dozen scientists, I concluded that global warming was real and that the prior estimates of the rate of warming were correct. I'm now going a step further: Humans are almost entirely the cause."

Funding
Between 2002 and 2010, the combined annual income of 91 climate change counter-movement organizations—think tanks, advocacy groups and industry associations—was roughly $900 million. During the same period, billionaires secretively donated nearly $120 million (£77 million) via the Donors Trust and Donors Capital Fund to more than 100 organizations seeking to undermine the public perception of the science on climate change.

As of the end of 2019, in the United States, 97 percent of the coal industry's political contributions and 88 percent of the oil and gas industries' contributions had gone to Republicans, leading economist Paul Krugman to call the Republicans "the world's only major climate-denialist party".

Public opinion 

Public opinion on climate change is significantly affected by media coverage of climate change, and the effects of climate change denial campaigns. Campaigns to undermine public confidence in climate science have decreased public belief in climate change, which in turn have affected legislative efforts to curb  emissions. Another reason why the public is skeptical about climate change is their lack of knowledge.

United States

In a 2006 ABC News/Time/Stanford Poll, 56% of Americans correctly answered that average global temperatures had risen over the previous three years. However, in the same poll, two-thirds said they believed that scientists had "a lot of disagreement" about "whether or not global warming is happening".

From 2001 to 2012, the number of Americans who said they believe in anthropogenic global warming decreased from 75 percent to 44 percent.

A study found that public climate change policy support and behavior are significantly influenced by public beliefs, attitudes and risk perceptions. As of March 2018 the rate of acceptance among U.S. TV forecasters that the climate is changing has increased to ninety-five percent. The number of local television stories about global warming has also increased, by fifteen-fold. Climate Central has received some of the credit for this because they provide classes for meteorologists and graphics for television stations.

The popular media in the U.S. gives greater attention to climate change skeptics than the scientific community as a whole, and the level of agreement within the scientific community has not been accurately communicated. In some cases, news outlets have allowed climate change skeptics to explain the science of climate change instead of experts in climatology. US and UK media coverage differ from that presented in other countries, where reporting is more consistent with the scientific literature. Some journalists attribute the difference to climate change denial being propagated, mainly in the US, by business-centered organizations employing tactics worked out previously by the US tobacco lobby. In France, the US and the UK, the opinions of climate change skeptics appear much more frequently in conservative news outlets than other news, and in many cases those opinions are left uncontested.

The efforts of Al Gore and other environmental campaigns have focused on the effects of global warming and have managed to increase awareness and concern, but despite these efforts, the number of Americans believing humans are the cause of global warming was holding steady at 61% in 2007, and those believing the popular media was understating the issue remained about 35%. A recent poll from 2015 suggests that while Americans are growing more aware of the dangers and implications of climate change for future generations, the majority are not worried about it. From a survey conducted in 2004, it was found that more than 30% of news presented in the previous decade showed equal attention to both human and non human contributions to global warming.

In 2018, the National Science Teachers Association urged teachers to "emphasize to students that no scientific controversy exists regarding the basic facts of climate change."

Europe 

Climate change denial has been promoted by several far-right European parties, including Spain's Vox, Finland's far-right Finns Party, Austria's far-right Freedom Party, and Germany's anti-immigration Alternative for Deutschland (AfD).

Nationalism 
It has been suggested that climate change can conflict with a nationalistic view because it is "unsolvable" at the national level and requires collective action between nations or between local communities, and that therefore populist nationalism tends to reject the science of climate change.

In a TED talk Yuval Noah Harari notes: 

In 2019, U.S. Undersecretary of Energy Mark W. Menezes said that the Freeport LNG project's exports would be "spreading freedom gas throughout the world", while Assistant Secretary for Fossil Energy Steven Winberg echoed the call to internationally export "molecules of US freedom".

On the other hand, it has been argued that effective climate action is polycentric rather than international, and national interest in multilateral groups can be furthered by overcoming climate change denial. Climate change contrarians may believe in a "caricature" of internationalist state intervention that is perceived as threatening national sovereignty, and may re-attribute risks such as flooding to international institutions. UK Independence Party policy on climate change has been influenced by noted contrarian Christopher Monckton and then by its energy spokesman Roger Helmer MEP who stated in a speech "It is not clear that the rise in atmospheric CO2 is anthropogenic."

Jerry Taylor of the Niskanen Center posits that climate change denial is an important component of Trumpian historical consciousness, and "plays a significant role in the architecture of Trumpism as a developing philosophical system".

Though climate change denial was apparently waning circa 2021, some right-wing nationalist organizations have adopted a theory of "environmental populism" advocating that natural resources should be preserved for a nation's existing residents, to the exclusion of immigrants. Other such right-wing organizations have contrived new "green wings" that falsely assert it is refugees from poor nations who are the cause of environmental pollution and climate change, and should therefore be excluded.

Lobbying 

Efforts to lobby against environmental regulation have included campaigns to manufacture doubt about the science behind climate change, and to obscure the scientific consensus and data. These efforts have undermined public confidence in climate science, and impacted climate change lobbying.

The political advocacy organizations FreedomWorks and Americans for Prosperity, funded by brothers David and Charles Koch of Koch Industries, were important in supporting the Tea Party movement and in encouraging the movement to focus on climate change. Other conservative organizations such as the Heritage Foundation, Marshall Institute, Cato Institute and the American Enterprise Institute were significant participants in these lobbying attempts, seeking to halt or eliminate environmental regulations.

This approach to downplay the significance of climate change was copied from tobacco lobbyists; in the face of scientific evidence linking tobacco to lung cancer, to prevent or delay the introduction of regulation. Lobbyists attempted to discredit the scientific research by creating doubt and manipulating debate. They worked to discredit the scientists involved, to dispute their findings, and to create and maintain an apparent controversy by promoting claims that contradicted scientific research. "'Doubt is our product,' boasted a now infamous 1969 industry memo. Doubt would shield the tobacco industry from litigation and regulation for decades to come." In 2006, George Monbiot wrote in The Guardian about similarities between the methods of groups funded by Exxon, and those of the tobacco giant Philip Morris, including direct attacks on peer-reviewed science, and attempts to create public controversy and doubt.

Former National Academy of Sciences president Frederick Seitz, who, according to an article by Mark Hertsgaard in Vanity Fair, earned about US$585,000 in the 1970s and 1980s as a consultant to R.J. Reynolds Tobacco Company, went on to chair groups such as the Science and Environmental Policy Project and the George C. Marshall Institute alleged to have made efforts to "downplay" global warming. Seitz stated in the 1980s that "Global warming is far more a matter of politics than of climate." Seitz authored the Oregon Petition, a document published jointly by the Marshall Institute and Oregon Institute of Science and Medicine in opposition to the Kyoto protocol. The petition and accompanying "Research Review of Global Warming Evidence" claimed:

The proposed limits on greenhouse gases would harm the environment, hinder the advance of science and technology, and damage the health and welfare of mankind. There is no convincing scientific evidence that human release of carbon dioxide, methane, or other greenhouse gases is causing or will, in the foreseeable future, cause catastrophic heating of the Earth's atmosphere and disruption of the Earth's climate. ... We are living in an increasingly lush environment of plants and animals as a result of the carbon dioxide increase. Our children will enjoy an Earth with far more plant and animal life than that with which we now are blessed. This is a wonderful and unexpected gift from the Industrial Revolution.

George Monbiot wrote in The Guardian that this petition, which he criticizes as misleading and tied to industry funding, "has been cited by almost every journalist who claims that climate change is a myth". Efforts by climate change denial groups played a significant role in the eventual rejection of the Kyoto protocol in the US.

Monbiot has written about another group founded by the tobacco lobby, The Advancement of Sound Science Coalition (TASSC), that now campaigns against measures to combat global warming. In again trying to manufacture the appearance of a grass-roots movement against "unfounded fear" and "over-regulation", Monbiot states that TASSC "has done more damage to the campaign to halt [climate change] than any other body".

Drexel University environmental sociologist Robert Brulle analysed the funding of 91 organizations opposed to restrictions on carbon emissions, which he termed the "climate change counter-movement". Between 2003 and 2013, the donor-advised funds Donors Trust and Donors Capital Fund, combined, were the largest funders, accounting for about one quarter of the total funds, and the American Enterprise Institute was the largest recipient, 16% of the total funds. The study also found that the amount of money donated to these organizations by means of foundations whose funding sources cannot be traced had risen.

The work of economic consultancy Charles River Associates forecasting the impact on employment of the 2003 Climate Stewardship Act was criticized by the Natural Resources Defense Council in 2005 for using unrealistic economic assumptions and producing directionally incorrect estimates. A 2021 study concluded their work from the 1990s to the 2010s overestimated predicted costs and ignored potential policy benefits, and was often presented by politicians and lobbyists as independent rather than sponsored by the fossil fuel industry. Other papers published during that time by economists at MIT and Wharton Econometric Forecasting Associates, also with funding from the fossil fuel industry, produced similar conclusions.

Private sector 

Several large corporations within the fossil fuel industry provide significant funding for attempts to mislead the public about the trustworthiness of climate science. ExxonMobil and the Koch family foundations have been identified as especially influential funders of climate change contrarianism. The bankruptcy of the coal company Cloud Peak Energy revealed it funded the Institute for Energy Research, a climate denial think tank, as well as several other policy influencers.

After the IPCC released its February 2007 report, the American Enterprise Institute offered British, American and other scientists $10,000 plus travel expenses to publish articles critical of the assessment. The institute had received more than US$1.6 million from Exxon, and its vice-chairman of trustees was former head of Exxon Lee Raymond. Raymond sent letters that alleged the IPCC report was not "supported by the analytical work." More than 20 AEI employees worked as consultants to the George W. Bush administration. Despite her initial conviction that climate change denial would abate with time, Senator Barbara Boxer said that when she learned of the AEI's offer, she "realized there was a movement behind this that just wasn't giving up".

The Royal Society conducted a survey that found ExxonMobil had given US$2.9 million to American groups that "misinformed the public about climate change", 39 of which "misrepresented the science of climate change by outright denial of the evidence". In 2006, the Royal Society issued a demand that ExxonMobil withdraw funding for climate change denial. The letter drew criticism, notably from Timothy Ball who argued the society attempted to "politicize the private funding of science and to censor scientific debate".

Research conducted at an Exxon archival collection at the University of Texas and interviews with former employees by journalists indicate the scientific opinion within the company and their public posture towards climate change was contradictory. A systematic review of Exxon's climate modeling projections concluded that in private and academic circles since the late 1970s and early 1980s, ExxonMobil predicted global warming correctly and skillfully, correctly dismissed the possibility of a coming ice age in favor of a "carbon dioxide induced super-interglacial", and reasonably estimated how much CO2 would lead to dangerous warming.

Between 1989 and 2002, the Global Climate Coalition, a group of mainly United States businesses, used aggressive lobbying and public relations tactics to oppose action to reduce greenhouse gas emissions and fight the Kyoto Protocol. The coalition was financed by large corporations and trade groups from the oil, coal and auto industries. The New York Times reported that "even as the coalition worked to sway opinion [towards skepticism], its own scientific and technical experts were advising that the science backing the role of greenhouse gases in global warming could not be refuted". In 2000, Ford Motor Company was the first company to leave the coalition as a result of pressure from environmentalists, followed by Daimler-Chrysler, Texaco, the Southern Company and General Motors subsequently left to GCC. The organization closed in 2002.

From January 2009 through June 2010, the oil, coal and utility industries spent $500 million in lobby expenditures in opposition to legislation to address climate change.

In early 2015, several media reports emerged saying that Willie Soon, a popular scientist among climate change deniers, had failed to disclose conflicts of interest in at least 11 scientific papers published since 2008. They reported that he received a total of $1.25m from ExxonMobil, Southern Company, the American Petroleum Institute and a foundation run by the Koch brothers. Charles R. Alcock, director of the Harvard–Smithsonian Center for Astrophysics, where Soon was based, said that allowing funders of Soon's work to prohibit disclosure of funding sources was a mistake, which will not be permitted in future grant agreements.

Lewandowsky reports that by asking four questions about the free market he is able to predict with "67% "confidence" (that is, variance)" an individual's attitudes towards climate change.

Public sector 

The Republican Party in the United States is unique in denying anthropogenic climate change among conservative political parties across the Western world. In 1994, according to a leaked memo, the Republican strategist Frank Luntz advised members of the Republican Party, with regard to climate change, that "you need to continue to make the lack of scientific certainty a primary issue" and "challenge the science" by "recruiting experts who are sympathetic to your view". (In 2006, Luntz said he still believes "back [in] '97, '98, the science was uncertain", but he now agrees with the scientific consensus.) From 2008 to 2017, the Republican Party went from "debating how to combat human-caused climate change to arguing that it does not exist", according to The New York Times. In 2011, "more than half of the Republicans in the House and three-quarters of Republican senators" said "that the threat of global warming, as a human-made and highly threatening phenomenon, is at best an exaggeration and at worst an utter 'hoax according to Judith Warner writing in The New York Times Magazine. In 2014, more than 55% of congressional Republicans were climate change deniers, according to NBC News. According to PolitiFact in May 2014, Jerry Brown's statement that "virtually no Republican" in Washington accepts climate change science, was "mostly true"; PolitiFact counted "eight out of 278, or about 3 percent" of Republican members of Congress who "accept the prevailing scientific conclusion that global warming is both real and man-made."

In 2005, The New York Times reported that Philip Cooney, former fossil fuel lobbyist and "climate team leader" at the American Petroleum Institute and President George W. Bush's chief of staff of the Council on Environmental Quality, had "repeatedly edited government climate reports in ways that play down links between such emissions and global warming, according to internal documents". Sharon Begley reported in Newsweek that Cooney "edited a 2002 report on climate science by sprinkling it with phrases such as 'lack of understanding' and 'considerable uncertainty'." Cooney reportedly removed an entire section on climate in one report, whereupon another lobbyist sent him a fax saying "You are doing a great job." Cooney announced his resignation two days after the story of his tampering with scientific reports broke, but a few days later it was announced that Cooney would take up a position with ExxonMobil.

United States Secretary of Energy Rick Perry, in a June 2017 interview with CNBC, acknowledged the existence of climate change and impact from humans, but said that he did not agree with the idea that carbon dioxide was the primary driver of global warming pointing instead to "the ocean waters and this environment that we live in". The American Meteorological Society responded in a letter to Perry saying that it is "critically important that you understand that emissions of carbon dioxide and other greenhouse gases are the primary cause", pointing to conclusions of scientists worldwide.

Republican Jim Bridenstine, the first elected politician to serve as NASA administrator, had previously stated that global temperatures were not rising. A month after the Senate confirmed his NASA position in April 2018, he acknowledged that human emissions of greenhouse gases are raising global temperatures.

Although climate denial have started to decrease among the Republican Party leadership towards an acknowledgement that "the climate is changing", a 2019 study from several major think tanks describes the climate right as "fragmented and underfunded".

Acknowledgement of climate change by politicians, while expressing uncertainty as to how much climate change can be attributed to human activity, has been described as a new form of climate denial, and "a reliable tool to manipulate public perception of climate change and stall political action".

Schools 
According to documents leaked in February 2012, The Heartland Institute is developing a curriculum for use in schools which frames climate change as a scientific controversy. In 2017, Glenn Branch, Deputy Director of the National Center for Science Education (NCSE), wrote that "the Heartland Institute is continuing to inflict its climate change denial literature on science teachers across the country". He also described how some science teachers were reacting to Heartland's mailings: "Fortunately, the Heartland mailing continues to be greeted with skepticism and dismissed with scorn." The NCSE has prepared Classroom Resources in response to Heartland and other anti-science threats.

Branch also referred to an article by ClimateFeedback.org which reviewed an unsolicited Heartland booklet, entitled "Why Scientists Disagree about Global Warming", which was sent to science teachers in the United States. Their intention was to send it to "more than 200,000 K–12 teachers". Each significant claim was rated for accuracy by scientists who were experts on that topic. Overall, they scored the accuracy of the booklet with an "F": "it could hardly score lower", and "the 'Key Findings' section are incorrect, misleading, based on flawed logic, or simply factually inaccurate".

Effect 
Manufactured uncertainty over climate change, the fundamental strategy of climate change denial, has been very effective, particularly in the US. It has contributed to low levels of public concern and to government inaction worldwide. An Angus Reid poll released in 2010 indicates that global warming skepticism in the United States, Canada, and the United Kingdom has been rising. There may be multiple causes of this trend, including a focus on economic rather than environmental issues, and a negative perception of the United Nations and its role in discussing climate change.

Another cause may be weariness from overexposure to the topic: secondary polls suggest that the public may have been discouraged by extremism when discussing the topic, while other polls show 54% of U.S. voters believe that "the news media make global warming appear worse than it really is." A poll in 2009 regarding the issue of whether "some scientists have falsified research data to support their own theories and beliefs about global warming" showed that 59% of Americans believed it "at least somewhat likely", with 35% believing it was "very likely".

According to Tim Wirth, "They patterned what they did after the tobacco industry. ... Both figured, sow enough doubt, call the science uncertain and in dispute. That's had a huge impact on both the public and Congress." This approach has been propagated by the US media, presenting a false balance between climate science and climate skeptics. Newsweek reports that the majority of Europe and Japan accept the consensus on scientific climate change, but only one third of Americans considered human activity to play a major role in climate change in 2006; 64% believed that scientists disagreed about it "a lot." A 2007 Newsweek poll found these numbers were declining, although majorities of Americans still believed that scientists were uncertain about climate change and its causes. Rush Holt wrote a piece for Science, which appeared in Newsweek:

Deliberate attempts by the Western Fuels Association "to confuse the public" have succeeded in their objectives. This has been "exacerbated by media treatment of the climate issue". According to a Pew poll in 2012, 57% of the US public are unaware of, or outright reject, the scientific consensus on climate change. Some organizations promoting climate change denial have asserted that scientists are increasingly rejecting climate change, but this notion is contradicted by research showing that 97% of published papers endorse the scientific consensus, and that percentage is increasing with time.

Social psychologist Craig Foster compares climate change denialists to flat-earth believers and the reaction to the latter by the scientific community. Foster states, "the potential and kinetic energy devoted to counter the flat-earth movement is wasteful and misguided ... I don't understand why anybody would worry about the flat-earth gnat while facing the climate change mammoth ... Climate change denial does not require belief. It only requires neglect."

In 2016, Aaron McCright argued that anti-environmentalism—and climate change denial specifically—has expanded to a point in the US where it has now become "a central tenet of the current conservative and Republican identity".

On the other hand, global oil companies have begun to acknowledge the existence of climate change and its risks. Still top oil firms are spending millions lobbying to delay, weaken or block policies to tackle climate change.

Manufactured climate change denial is also influencing how scientific knowledge is communicated to the public. According to climate scientist Michael E. Mann, "universities and scientific societies and organizations, publishers, etc.—are too often risk averse when it comes to defending and communicating science that is perceived as threatening by powerful interests".

See also 

 Climate change
 Tobacco industry playbook
 Agnotology
 Anti-environmentalism
 Carbon bubble
 Effects of climate change
 Environmental skepticism
 Information Council for the Environment
 International Conference on Climate Change
 Climate alarmist
 Motivated reasoning
 Renewable energy commercialization: Non-technical barriers to acceptance
 Semmelweis reflex
 Films:
 Climate Change Denial Disorder, satirical parody film about a fictional disease
 Before the Flood, documenting climate change denial and lobbying processes

References

Bibliography 

 
  (MSNBC single page version, archived 20 August 2007)

Further reading 

 Kathy Mulvey (January 2017). "Tillerson Refuses to Acknowledge ExxonMobil's Efforts to Deceive the Public on Climate Change"
 Hausfather, Zeke (January 2017). No 'Pause' in Global Warming: Oceans Heating Up and Sea Levels Rising at Alarming Pace. "Details the findings of a new report that confirms NOAA data about climate change."
 David Kaiser and Lee Wasserman (December 2016). "Part 1" and "Part 2", New York Review of Books
 "Frontline: Climate of Doubt". PBS. 23 October 2012. Retrieved 25 October 2012.
 
 Bowen, Mark (2008). Censoring Science: Dr. James Hansen and the Truth of Global Warming. Plume. 
 
 Shearer, Christine (2011). "Kivalina: A Climate Change Story" Haymarket Books. 
 Montlake, Simon (2019) What does climate change have to do with socialism The Christian Science Monitor
 Oreskes, Naomi, "History Matters to Science: It helps to explain how cynical actors undermine the truth", Scientific American, vol. 323, no. 6 (December 2020), p. 81. "In our 2010 book, Merchants of Doubt, Erik M. Conway and I showed how the same arguments [as those used to cast doubt on the link between tobacco use and lung cancer] were used to delay action on acid rain, the ozone hole and climate change—and this year [2020] we saw the spurious 'freedom' argument being used to disparage mask wearing [during the COVID-19 pandemic]."
 
 "Climate fight 'is undermined by social media's toxic reports'". The Guardian. 21 March 2021.

 
Science and technology-related conspiracy theories
Articles containing video clips
Conspiracy theories promoted by Donald Trump